
Gmina Odrzywół is a rural gmina (administrative district) in Przysucha County, Masovian Voivodeship, in east-central Poland.

Villages
Gmina Odrzywół contains the villages and settlements of Ceteń, Dąbrowa, Jelonek, Kamienna Wola, Kłonna, Kolonia Ossa, Łęgonice Małe, Lipiny, Myślakowice, Myślakowice-Kolonia, Odrzywół, Ossa, Różanna, Stanisławów, Wandzinów and Wysokin.

Neighbouring gminas
Gmina Odrzywół is bordered by the gminas of Drzewica, Klwów, Nowe Miasto nad Pilicą, Poświętne, Rusinów and Rzeczyca.

References
Polish official population figures 2006

Odrzywol
Przysucha County